Ellis Williams House, also known as the Spatz Property and Allston Spatz House, is a historic home located in East Goshen Township, Chester County, Pennsylvania. It was built in three sections. It is a two-story, four bay stone dwelling. The older section dates to about 1754, and was built on the Penn Plan.  It is believed to have been built on the foundations of an earlier dwelling built in 1704.  The original house was expanded about 1790 to a "four room house," then a workshop addition was built about 1820.  Another addition was built about 1930, then rebuilt in 1997.

It was added to the National Register of Historic Places in 2004.

References

Houses on the National Register of Historic Places in Pennsylvania
Houses completed in 1790
Houses in Chester County, Pennsylvania
National Register of Historic Places in Chester County, Pennsylvania